Glyphostoma otohimeae is a species of sea snail, a marine gastropod mollusk in the family Clathurellidae.

Description

Distribution
This species occurs in the Pacific Ocean along the Philippines.

References

External links
 

otohimeae
Gastropods described in 1981